These are the official results of the Women's Triple Jump event at the 2003 World Championships in Paris, France. There were a total number of 29 participating athletes, with the final held on Tuesday 26 August 2003.

Medalists

Schedule
All times are Central European Time (UTC+1)

Abbreviations
All results shown are in metres

Qualification

Final

See also
Athletics at the 2003 Pan American Games – Women's triple jump

References
 Results(  2009-05-14)

J
Triple jump at the World Athletics Championships
2003 in women's athletics